Charles Ash "Pie" Way (December 29, 1897 – January 31, 1988) was an American football player and coach. He played college football at Pennsylvania State University, where was a consensus selection to 1920 College Football All-America Team as a halfback.

After leading the 1920 Penn State Nittany Lions football team to an undefeated season, the small (144 lb.) but speedy Way began his professional career in the National Football League (NFL), first with the Canton Bulldogs in 1921 and became an All-Pro as a member of fellow Nittany Lion, Punk Berryman's Frankford Yellow Jackets in 1924. He was a member of the 1926 American Football League champion Philadelphia Quakers.

Way served as the head football at the University of Dayton in 1921.  He also coach at Virginia Tech.

Way earned a Bachelor of Arts degree in finance from Penn State University in 1921 and had a long career with the Internal Revenue Service following his playing days. He lived in Thorndale, Pennsylvania until his death at age 90.

Head coaching record

College

Notes

References

External links
 

1897 births
1988 deaths
American football halfbacks
American football quarterbacks
Canton Bulldogs players
Dayton Flyers football coaches
Frankford Yellow Jackets players
Penn State Nittany Lions football players
Philadelphia Quakers (AFL) players
Virginia Tech Hokies football coaches
People from Chester County, Pennsylvania
Players of American football from Pennsylvania